Eteobalea isabellella is a moth in the family Cosmopterigidae. It is found in Spain, France, Italy, Corsica, the Balkan Peninsula, Turkey and North Africa.

The wingspan is about 14 mm. Adults are on wing from May to early October in two generations per year.

References

Moths described in 1836
Eteobalea
Moths of Europe
Moths of Asia